Reynoldsburg City School District, or Reynoldsburg City Schools, is a school district headquartered in Reynoldsburg, Ohio.

In Franklin County, it includes the majority of the portions of Reynoldsburg in that county and small portions of Columbus.

A portion is in Licking County, where it includes most of the Licking County portion of Reynoldsburg.

A portion is in Fairfield County, where it includes a portion of the Fairfield County portion of Reynoldsburg.

History

In 2021 the district proposed a bond, worth $85 million, which would have established a preschool, additional kindergarten programs which would have taken the whole instructional day, and replacements of sections of Hannah Alston Middle School. The bond vote failed, with a 207-vote difference between fail and pass. Cyn Rosi and Karina Cheung of NBC 4i described the bond election as "extremely tight".

Tracy Reed became the superintendent in 2022.

Schools
 High school
 Reynoldsburg High School – Has two campuses: Livingston Campus and Summit Campus

 Middle school
 Hannah J. Ashton Middle School
 The initial section of the building was built in 1868. In 1925 the building was expanded. In 1954 another expansion occurred. In 1964 another expansion occurred. In 2005 another expansion occurred. In January 2023 the school had 450 students. In 2023 the district stated that it would have to pay $18 million to repair the school to a suitable condition. Instead the school will close after the end of the 2022–2023 school year.
 Baldwin Road Middle School
 Waggoner Road Middle School
 Waggoner Road Junior High School

 Elementary school
 French Run Elementary
 Herbert Mills
 Rose Hill
 Summit Road Elementary
 Taylor Road

 Preschool
 Located at the Livingston Campus of Reynoldsburg High School

Eastland-Fairfield Career & Technical School

References

External links
 Reynoldsburg City Schools

School districts in Ohio
Education in Fairfield County, Ohio
Education in Franklin County, Ohio
Education in Licking County, Ohio
Education in Columbus, Ohio